Al-Dahab Club  is a Saudi Arabian football team in Mahd adh Dhahab City playing at the Saudi Second Division.

Ascending to Second Division
He promoted to the Saudi Second Division after the decision of the Saudi Arabian Football Federation to ascend 8 clubs.

Current squad 
As of Saudi Second Division:

References

Dahab
2014 establishments in Saudi Arabia
Association football clubs established in 2014
Football clubs in Mahd adh Dhahab